Regina Holan is a former American football striker of Czech descent. She played for Portland Pilots and California Golden Bears in the NCAA, Sparta Prague in the Czech First Division, and San Francisco Nighthawks in the WPSL. With Sparta she took part in the UEFA Women's Cup.

Married with a Greek citizen, she was a member of the Greek national team.

References

1977 births
Living people
American people of Czech descent
Greek women's footballers
American women's soccer players
Expatriate women's footballers in the Czech Republic
Portland Pilots women's soccer players
Women's association football forwards
California Golden Bears women's soccer players
AC Sparta Praha (women) players
Czech Women's First League players
Soccer players from Denver
American expatriate sportspeople in the Czech Republic